Renée Faure (born Reneé Paule Nanine Faure; November 4, 1918 – May 2, 2005) was a French stage and film actress.

Early life
Renée Faure was born Reneé Paule Nanine Faure on November 4, 1918 in Paris, France. Her father was René Faure, director of the Lariboisière Hospital in Paris.

A student of René Simon and André Brunot, Faure joined to the Comédie-Française, as a boarder on 1937, before being appointed member, on 1942. She then performed in major repertoire pieces, particularly excelling in the theater by Marivaux and Musset.

Career
In 1941, she made her film debut in  L'Assassinat du père Noël , the first film produced by Continental Films, in which she plays the daughter of Harry Baur.

Her following performances confirmed her qualities as an interpreter, quickly passing from angelic roles Angels of Sin (1943) to those, otherwise more ambiguous, of passionate woman such as in François Villon (1945), Torrents (1947), and Bel Ami (1955).  She quickly shared the bill with the stars of the time, playing three times with Jean Gabin (The President, 1961).

Faure was a jury member during the 1953 Cannes Film Festival.

She left the Comédie-Française on 1964.  Almost immediately, on 1965, the institution paid homage to Faure by raising her to the rank of honorary member, which enabled her to return to play, twenty-two years later, the role  of the first prioress, in Dialogue with the Carmelites by Georges Bernanos, in 1987.

The following decade saw the actress devote herself to television and the theater.  Known to the general public through successful series such as Les Gens de Mogador or  Maigret , the actress only appears from  far and wide on the big screen, playing with her deep voice and her graceful demeanor in "The Judge and the Assassin", by Bertrand Tavernier, alongside Philippe Noiret  and Michel Galabru.  In 1988, Claude Miller distributed it in the role of the matriarch of "La Petite Voleuse" facing the young Charlotte Gainsbourg.

In the 1990s, Renée Faure slowed down her activity, nevertheless appearing in À la vitesse d'un cheval au galop (1992) and L'inconnu dans la maison (1992), remake of the film  directed by Henri Decoin in 1941, the year of her film debut.

Personal life
Faure married French actor Renaud Mary, in which they had a child. She later divorced him and later married director Christian-Jaque, who he directed her film debut. The couple worked together in three more times together in: The Bellman (1945), La Chartreuse de Parme (1948) and Adorables Créatures (1952) before divorcing in 1953.

Death
Faure died on May 2, 2005 in Clamart, France at the age of 86.

Filmography
1941: L'Assassinat du père Noël (by Christian-Jaque) - Catherine Cornusse
1942: Prince Charming (by Jean Boyer) - Rosine
1943: Des jeunes filles dans la nuit (by René Le Hénaff) - Mademoiselle Barfleur
1943: Les Anges du péché (by Robert Bresson) - Anne-Marie Lamaury
1944: Behold Beatrice (by Jean de Marguenat) - Béatrice
1945: François Villon (by André Zwoboda) - Catherine de Vauselles
1945: The Bellman (by Christian-Jaque) - Catherine Fabret
1946: The Great Dawn -La Grande Aurore (by Giuseppe Maria Scotese) - Anna Gamba
1947: Torrents (by Serge de Poligny) - Sigrid
1948: La Chartreuse de Parme (by Christian-Jaque) - Clelia Conti
1948: L'Ombre (by André Berthomieu) - Denise Fournier
1949: On n'aime qu'une fois (by Jean Stelli) - Danièle de Bolestac
1952: Adorables Créatures (by Christian-Jaque) - Alice
1953: Koenigsmark (by Solange Térac) - Mélusine de Graffendried
1954: Rasputin (by Georges Combret) - Véra
1955: Bel Ami (by Louis Daquin) - Madeleine Forestier
1956: Blood to the Head (by Gilles Grangier) - Mademoiselle
1958: Cargaison blanche (by Georges Lacombe) - Mme Ploit
1959: Rue des prairies (by Denys de La Patellière) - Me Surville
1961: Le Président (by Henri Verneuil) - Mademoiselle Milleran
1966: Les Sultans (by Jean Delannoy) - Odette Messager
1974: Madame Bovary (by Pierre Cardinal) (TV Movie) - Mme Bovary, mère
1976: The Judge and the Assassin (by Bertrand Tavernier) - Mme. Rousseau
1979: Un Neveu silencieux (by Robert Enrico) (TV Series) - Mme Verrière
1982: Ombre et secrets (by Philippe Delabre) (Short)
1985: L'Amour en douce (by Edouard Molinaro) - Tante Thérèse
1988: The Little Thief (by Claude Miller) - Mère Busato
1989: Dédé (by Jean-Louis Benoît) - the grand mother
1992: À la vitesse d'un cheval au galop (by Fabien Onteniente) - Odette Courcel
1992: L'Inconnu dans la maison (by Georges Lautner) - Fine
1997: La Vie intérieure (by Eddy Geradon-Luyckx)
1998: Homère, la dernière odyssée (by Fabio Carpi) - Eugénie

External links

 
 

1918 births
2005 deaths
Sociétaires of the Comédie-Française
Actresses from Paris
French stage actresses
French film actresses
20th-century French women